Emjo Basshe (born Emmanuel Iode Abarbanel Basshe or Emanuel Joseph Jochelman; January 20, 1898 – October 29, 1939) was a Lithuanian-born Jewish American playwright of Spanish ancestry and theatre director who co-founded New York City's New Playwrights Theatre in 1926. A recipient of 1931 Guggenheim Fellowship for creative work in theatre and drama, and one of the initial members, in 1935, of the Communist Party-founded League of American Writers, he won first prize for Thunderbolt, also referenced as Thunder-Clock, which was judged in a University of Chicago competition to be the "best unproduced long play of the year 1935".

Work with Provincetown Playhouse
Born in Vilnius, the capital of Lithuania, then a part of the Russian Empire, Emjo Basshe immigrated to the United States in 1912, at the age of 14. Graduating from Columbia University in 1919, he began his theatrical career with the Provincetown Playhouse on Greenwich Village's MacDougal Street and, in 1920, went to Massachusetts, working with Boston's Peabody Playhouse, then Chelsea Arts Theatre and Cambridge's Castle Square Players, all during 1920–22. Returning to Provincetown Playhouse, he remained until the premiere, on November 6, 1925, of his play, Adam Solitaire, directed by Stanley Howlett, and featuring 19-year-old John Huston among the production's eighteen Provincetown Players, named after and connected with the founders and players of Massachusetts' Provincetown Playhouse on Cape Cod. Closing night, after 17 performances, was two weeks later and Basshe moved to Pennsylvania, becoming director of the Stage Repertory of Philadelphia, where his three short plays, The Bitter Fantasy, The Star and Soil were presented.

Co-founder of the New Playwrights Theatre
Again returning to New York, Basshe co-founded, with four others, the New Playwrights Theatre, initially finding a temporary home at the 52nd Street Theatre, where it premiered, on March 9, 1927, his new play, Earth, directed by Russell Wright and Hemsley Winfield. Closing night, after 24 performances, was at the end of the month. Eight months later, On November 29, 1927, in the theatre's home base at another Greenwich Village address, 38 Commerce Street, Basshe's new play, Centuries, set among Jewish residents of a New York City tenement house, had its premiere. Directed by the author, the production had a cast of 27, including future film star Franchot Tone, and lasted for 39 performances, closing in January.

Continuing as a director, Basshe next helmed the Playhouse's production of Upton Sinclair's prison-based drama, Singing Jailbirds, which featured future character star, Lionel Stander, as one of the prisoners. Premiering on December 6, 1928, the play lasted 79 performances, closing in February. Provincetown Playhouse dissolved in April 1929 and Basshe pursued his career as a Broadway director at other venues, co-supervising North Carolina playwright Paul Green's musical drama, Roll, Sweet Chariot, set, according to its description, in "A Negro Village Somewhere in the South". The production, with 51 cast members, premiered at the Cort Theatre on October 2, 1934 and lasted 7 performances. Another Green play directed by Basshe, Turpentine, opened at the Lafayette Theatre on June 26, 1936 and closed in August, following 62 performances.

On May 13, a month before the premiere of Turpentine, Basshe's anti-war satire, The Snickering Horses, with a cast of 34, was staged at Daly's 63rd Street Theatre as the concluding presentation of Works Progress Administration's Federal Theatre Project Experimental Theatre three-performance cycle of three one-act plays, with the other two being George Bernard Shaw's Great Catherine: Whom Glory Still Adores and, condensed into one act by Alfred Saxe, Molière's The Miser. In its synopsis of The Snickering Horses, New Theatre Magazine describes "..the horses who pull the stuck artillery out of the mud, and are blown to bits,—with the soldiers—only the horses are smarter. They know enough to snicker at the hocus-pocus of 'dying for God and Country'. The soldiers, blown to chunks, are now on a par with the ice-packed five-star beef shipped East to feed the army..." A few months earlier, writing in the January 7, 1936 (no. 18) issue of the Communist Party-affiliated publication, The New Masses, Basshe praised Clara Weatherwax's novel, Marching! Marching! with the words, "[T]he workers won't have any trouble understanding it, [A]nd if they do stumble here and there, they won't mind learning because this is of them and for them."

Death in 1939
In January 1939, Basshe staged a production of three one-act plays: Paul Vincent Carroll's Ireland-based, The Coggerers (later renamed The Conspirators), Jean Giraudoux's Mr. Banks of Birmingham and Josephinna Niggli's The Red Velvet Goat, which opened at the Hudson Theatre on January 20, 1939 and closed the following day, after three performances.

Emjo Basshe was admitted to Bellevue Hospital on October 11, 1939 and died there on October 29, twelve weeks before his 42nd birthday. In its October 29 obituary, The New York Times stated that he "died last night" at the age of 40 and that "[H]is home was at Rock Tavern, Orange County, N. Y." Although the Guggenheim Foundation's capsule description of his creative output ("[A]s published in the Foundation’s Report for 1931–32") indicates his birthdate exactly ("[B]orn January 20, 1898, in Lithuania"), other sources, including The Times' obituary, display uncertainty ("[B]orn: circa. 1899").

References

External links

 (archive)
Emjo Basshe at Broadway World

1898 births
1939 deaths
Writers from Vilnius
People from Vilna Governorate
Lithuanian Jews
Emigrants from the Russian Empire to the United States
American people of Lithuanian-Jewish descent
20th-century American dramatists and playwrights
Columbia University alumni
People from New Windsor, New York
Writers from New York (state)